Scott Thomas Wilk Sr. (born March 16, 1959) is an American politician who served as the California State Senate minority leader from January 20, 2021 until December 5, 2022. He is a Republican representing the 21st district, encompassing Antelope Valley, Victor Valley, and most of the Santa Clarita Valley. Prior to his election to the Senate, he served two terms in the California State Assembly. He was also a College of the Canyons Trustee.

Background 

Wilk earned his B.A. in political science from California State University, Bakersfield. He has served on the board of directors of the Henry Mayo Newhall Memorial Hospital Foundation and the Santa Clarita Valley Chamber of Commerce’s Legislative Committee.  He is a member of the Simi Valley Chamber of Commerce and a past member of the Granada Hills Rotary Club.

Wilk was appointed to the Santa Clarita College District Board of Trustees on August 23, 2006.  He was re-elected in November 2007 and November 2011. He also worked as a small business owner, ran a communications firm, and was a former legislative staffer.

Career

California State Assembly 
Wilk was elected to represent the 38th Assembly District on November 5, 2012. He received 56.9% of the vote. Wilk was re-elected in 2014, receiving 66.3% of the vote. While in the Assembly, Wilk served on the following committees: Budget Committee (Sub 4 - State Administration), the Governmental Organization Committee, and the Joint Committee on Arts.

While in the Assembly, Wilk was the principal co-author of the California Film and Television Job Retention and Promotion Act. He also co-authored a $420 million tax incentive that helped land a $60 billion aerospace contract expected to create 6,500 new jobs in the High Desert. In 2014, Scott was selected by the non-partisan, non-profit State Legislative Leaders Foundation to attend the Emerging Leaders Program held at the University of Virginia.

California State Senate 

In California State Senate, Wilk is the vice-chair of the Governmental Organization committee. On January 20, 2021, Wilk was elected as the Senate Republican Leader.

Elections

2014 California State Assembly

2012 California State Assembly

Endorsements 
Unlike many Republicans, Wilk has garnered endorsements from organized labor. He has received endorsements from AFSCME Local 3299 (American Federation of State, County, & Municipal Employees), the Armenian National Committee of America-Western Region (ANCA-WR), California Professional Firefighters, California ProLife Council, Gun Owners of California, National Rifle Association, PawPAC - California's Political Action Committee for Animals, and Peace Officers Research Association of California.

In 2020, Wilk was endorsed by The Santa Clarita Valley Signal, a news media organization owned by Richard Budman and his wife, Chris. In 2019, The Signal listed Wilk at no. 2 on its list of Santa Clarita Valley's most influential people.

Personal life 

Wilk and his wife, Vanessa, reside in Santa Clarita with their two dogs. They have two adult children, Scott, Jr. and Alison.

Wilk's wife, Vanessa, is a district director for California State Assembly member Tom Lackey.  She is also the chair of the City of Santa Clarita's Arts Commission and a member of the board of directors of the Santa Clarita Valley Committee on Aging.

References

External links 
 

1959 births
21st-century American politicians
Republican Party California state senators
California State University, Bakersfield alumni
Living people
Republican Party members of the California State Assembly
People from Santa Clarita, California